Burlington Flats is a hamlet (and census-designated place) in the Town of Burlington in Otsego County, New York, United States. It is located at coordinates .

Notable person
Baseball Hall of Famer William Hulbert was born in Burlington Flats.

References

Hamlets in New York (state)
Hamlets in Otsego County, New York